Faustabryna metallica is a species of beetle in the family Cerambycidae. It was described by Stephan von Breuning in 1938, originally under the genus Abryna. It is known from the Philippines.

References

Pteropliini
Beetles described in 1938